Wubana atypica is a species of sheetweb spider in the family Linyphiidae. It is found in the United States and Canada, and was first described in 1936 by Chamberlin and Irvie.

References

Linyphiidae
Articles created by Qbugbot
Spiders described in 1936